Scythris kyzylensis is a moth of the family Scythrididae. It was described by Bengt Å. Bengtsson in 1997. It is found in Russia (Tuva Republic).

References

kyzylensis
Moths described in 1997